Gábor Cseh (24 December 1916 – 27 July 1979) was a Hungarian sprint canoeist who competed in the late 1930s. At the 1936 Summer Olympics in Berlin, he finished 12th in the K-2 10000 m event while being eliminated in the heats of the K-2 1000 m event.

References

Gábor Cseh's profile at Sports Reference.com

1916 births
1979 deaths
Canoeists at the 1936 Summer Olympics
Hungarian male canoeists
Olympic canoeists of Hungary
20th-century Hungarian people